Ukraine competed at the 2014 Winter Paralympics in Sochi, Russia, held between 7–16 March 2014.

Alpine skiing 

Men

Snowboarding

Para-snowboarding is making its debut at the Winter Paralympics and it will be placed under the Alpine skiing program during the 2014 Games.

Men

Biathlon 

Men

Women

Cross-country skiing

Men

Women

Relay

Concerns and controversies

Prior to the Games, the Ukrainian territory of Crimea was seized by the Russian military in the wake of the Ukrainian revolution. The Ukraine team still participated in the Games, but Valeriy Sushkevich, head of the country's National Paralympic Committee, warned that "if there is an escalation of the conflict, intervention on the territory of our country, God forbid the worst, we would not be able to stay here. We would go." Similarly to the Olympics, political protests and statements among athletes were forbidden during Paralympic events, although two major, symbolic protests by the Ukrainian team occurred during the Games. During the opening ceremonies, all but one of the country's 31 athletes declined to participate in the parade of nations. The country was represented solely by Nordic skier and flagbearer Mykailo Tkachenko, whose entrance was greeted with an ovation from the audience. Some Ukrainian medalists were seen covering their medal with their hand during ceremonies as another form of silent protest; Sushkevich stated that the covering was "a demonstration that aggression and the high ideals of Paralympic sports are incompatible."

See also
Ukraine at the 2014 Winter Olympics

References

Nations at the 2014 Winter Paralympics
2014
Winter Paralympics